Dochia is a commune in Neamț County, Western Moldavia, Romania. It is composed of two villages, Bălușești and Dochia. These were part of Bahna Commune from 1864 to 1880, an independent commune from 1880 to 1968, part of Girov Commune from 1968 to 2003, and independent again since that year.

Natives
 Elena Avram

References

Communes in Neamț County
Localities in Western Moldavia